Federal Highway 35 (Fed. 35) is a free part of the federal highways corridors of Mexico, that is in two separate improved segments.

Fed. 35 in Jalisco connects Santa Rosa, Jalisco (near Ixtlahuacán de los Membrillos, Jalisco), to La Barca, Jalisco. The length of this segment of the highway is 79 km (49.1 mi).

Fed. 35 in Nuevo León connects China, Nuevo León to Montemorelos, Nuevo León. The length of this segment of the highway is 93 km (57.8 mi).

References

035